Artyom Khachaturov (born 18 June 1992) is an Armenian-Moldovan football player who plays as a defender.

Career

Club
Khachaturov debuted for Sheriff Tiraspol. While at Sheriff, the club has won the 2009–10 and 2011–12 Moldovan National Division and the 2009–10 Moldovan Cup.

In January 2016, Khachaturov joined Armenian Premier League side Ararat Yerevan, but his contract was cancelled on 8 February of the same year.

In March 2018, Khachaturov signed for Armenian First League club Lori FC. After achieving winning the 2017-18 Armenian First League and achieving promotion to the Armenian Premier League, Khachaturov earned captaincy to the team.

International
Khachaturov joined the Armenia national football team. Beforehand there were issues of his citizenship documents. On 25 January 2013, the Armenian Football Federation announced it received an official letter from FIFA, which states that Khachaturov now has the right to play for the national team. He was quoted as saying his dream has come true and that, "I'm coming home... " Khachaturov made his debut for the Armenia national team on 5 February 2013, in Valence, France in a match against Luxembourg.

After a 5-year absence from National Team action, Khachaturov returned to the senior squad under coach Armen Gyulbudaghyants, being called up for 2018 UEFA Nations League October and November camps, playing two full games in the 4–0 victory over Macedonia and a 2–2 draw against Liechtenstein. The Macedonia game ended up being one of the biggest wins for the Armenia national team in the last years.

Career statistics

Club

International

Statistics accurate as of match played 19 November 2019

Honours

Club
Sheriff Tiraspol
Moldovan National Division (3): 2009–10, 2011–12, 2012–13
Moldovan Cup (1): 2009–10

FC Lori
Armenian First League (1): 2017-18

Notes

References

External links

Profile at uefa.com
Profile at eurosport.co.uk
Profile at fc-sheriff.com

1992 births
Living people
People from Bender, Moldova
Armenian footballers
Moldovan footballers
Association football defenders
Armenia international footballers
Armenian expatriate footballers
Moldovan people of Armenian descent
FC Sheriff Tiraspol players
FC Kyzylzhar players
FC Ararat Yerevan players
CSF Bălți players
FC Tiraspol players
FC Zimbru Chișinău players
FC Lori players
Sevan FC players
FC Florești players
Moldovan Super Liga players
Armenian expatriate sportspeople in Kazakhstan
Moldovan expatriate sportspeople in Kazakhstan
Expatriate footballers in Kazakhstan